On June 5, 2020, during the George Floyd protests, the DC Public Works Department painted the words "Black Lives Matter" in  yellow capital letters on 16th Street NW on the north of Lafayette Square, part of President's Park near the White House, with the assistance of the MuralsDC program of the DC Department of Public Works, with the DC flag accompanying the text. Multiple other cities across the United States, as well as in Canada and the United Kingdom, subsequently painted their own "Black Lives Matter" murals.

Alabama
Birmingham "Black Lives Matter" was painted in yellow along First Avenue South in the Parkside District. On June 22, the city council did not vote on whether to rename part of Sixteenth Street North to "Black Lives Matter Boulevard", due to urging from local activists.
Hobson City On June 19, residents painted "Black Towns Matter" using yellow and red road paint along Martin Luther King Boulevard and plan to later paint "Black Lives Matter" along another section of the street.
Mobile On June 21, "Black Lives Matter" was painted in yellow along Conti Street downtown. Rain washed away the mural the following day.
Montgomery On June 19, volunteers painted "Black Lives Matter" around Court Square Fountain, once the site of a slave market, to commemorate Juneteenth. The mural is temporary and will be washed away once it begins to wear.

California

Berkeley On June 9, in response to the Oakland mural, the city council of nearby Berkeley approved painting "Black Lives Matter" on a street in front of the city hall, after students painted a similar street mural in front of Berkeley High School.
Calaveras and Tuolumne counties On June 9, "Black Lives Matter!" was found painted onto a bridge spanning the Middle Fork Stanislaus River in a remote area. By June 13, it had been defaced to read "All Lives Matter!"
La Jolla On June 14, faculty members from the UCSD Visual Arts Department began discussing a Black Lives Matter mural. On June 15, students, along with 3B Collective, faculty, and students, painted a 110-foot-long "Black Lives Matter" in yellow paint. 
Fresno On June 18, "Black Lives Matter" was painted in yellow along P Street in front of Fresno City Hall and the city council declared the day "Black Lives Matter Day".  
Los Angeles On August 31, 2020 the City of Los Angeles completed its first official and permanent All Black Lives Matter on-street public art mural by Luckie Alexander in the center lane of Hollywood Boulevard on the Hollywood Walk of Fame, replacing an earlier unofficial All Black Lives Matter on-street mural and paying tribute to transgender people of color.  The earlier mural was painted by volunteers on June 13, 2020 at the same site in conjunction with the June 14, 2020 All Black Lives Matter march.
Martinez On July 5, the words "Black Lives Matter" were painted in front of the Contra Costa County courthouse in downtown Martinez. The mural was defaced the day it was painted and was never restored.
Oakland On June 7, residents and community groups painted "Black Lives Matter" along three blocks of 15th Street in downtown Oakland.
Oakland On July 1, The Queer Healing Arts Center, 14 artists and over 250 community members - under the direction and design of the Queer Healing Arts Center's founder artivist Kin Folkz, artist Nkosi Smith and Imani Smith - painted a powerful mural in honor of Black Trans and Queer Lives that reads "ALL BLACK TRANS, QUEER, NON-BINARY, WOMEN, DISABLED, IMPRISONED LIVES MATTER" along seven blocks of Bellevue Ave/Lakeside Park Road at Lake Merritt (from Fairyland to the Lake Merritt Boathouse) in downtown Oakland.
Palo Alto On June 30, up to 16 Bay Area artists will paint a temporary "Black Lives Matter" mural along Hamilton Avenue in front of city hall.
Sacramento "Black Lives Matter!" was painted on Capitol Mall.
San Francisco The Bay Area Mural Program painted a three-block-long "Black Lives Matter" in yellow along Fulton Street in the Fillmore District, leading up to San Francisco City Hall.
Stockton On June 19, volunteers from across Northern California painted "Black Lives Matter" in the pan-African colors along a street in front of Victory Park.
 Santa Cruz

Colorado

Denver On June 12, hundreds of volunteers painted "Black Lives Matter" and "Remember This Time" along Broadway between the Colorado State Capitol and the City and County Building.

Connecticut
Bridgeport On June 19, "Black Lives Matter" was painted in yellow along Broad Street downtown.
New Haven –  On September 19, "Black Lives Matter" was painted in yellow on Basset Street, and on October 3rd on Temple Street.

Florida
Orlando On June 25, "Black Lives Matter" was painted in Pan-African colors on Rosalind Avenue.
St. Petersburg On June 19, "Black Lives Matter" was painted on the street in front of the Dr. Carter G. Woodson African American Museum.
Tallahassee On July 8, "Black Lives Matter" was painted at the intersection of Gaines Street and on Railroad Avenue.

Georgia
Atlanta Overnight on June 19, artists painted "Black Lives Matter" in yellow along the Eastside Trail.

Illinois

Chicago Catalpa Avenue in the Andersonville neighbourhood was painted with BLACK TRANS LIVES MATTER by 22 artists, it was organised by Andersonville Chamber of Commerce and Ald. Andre Vasquez.
 Evanston — Over the July 4 long weekend 2020, the public high school’s girls and boys basketball teams received city approval for the mural at right. It covers three city blocks on Dodge Avenue in front of the high school — 1700 Dodge. See photos. By the morning of the second day of its existence, someone had defaced it with white paint likely thrown from a vehicle at a high speed. It remains intact through June 30, 2021.
Oak Park From June 24 to 27, "Black Lives Matter" will be painted in multiple colors measuring  along Scoville Avenue.
Naperville A group of girls students see two young African American siblings put "Black live matter" shaped heart on a restaurant board and decide to help them, but some people were angry at them as a man is heard saying to the two group "This is a good city  and you want to ruin it!" as the man continue to berate the girls and the two young African American siblings, a white woman is seen ripping the hearts as her boyfriend also berated the group after they flipped them out and say "Only white have privilege to live not black" and they leave but the rest of the community show their support to Black live matter by putting their own BLM shaped hearts.

Indiana
Indianapolis According to the Indianapolis Star, Indy10 Black Lives Matter coordinated a mural painting event with other community organizations, activists, and artists from August 1 to 2, 2020. The mural was permitted by the Indianapolis City-County Council in a resolution against racism. Each letter or symbol in the mural was painted by a single Black artist. The mural was painted on Indiana Avenue, between the Indianapolis Urban League and Madam Walker Legacy Center. The mural was defaced on August 9, 2020.

Maryland
Baltimore On June 12, protesters painted "Defund the Police" on Gay Street in front of Baltimore City Hall. On June 21, residents painted "Black Lives Matter" in red along South Linwood Avenue at Patterson Park.
Cambridge On June 16, local artists began painting "Black Lives Matter" along Race Street near the Harriet Tubman Museum. The mural is expected to last about a year.
Salisbury "Black Lives Matter" was painted in blue, yellow, and green (the City of Salisbury's colors) along a Broad Street sidewalk. Broad Street was renamed to Black Lives Matter Boulevard on June 19.

Massachusetts
 Springfield

Michigan
Detroit On June 17, local artists and students painted "Power to the People" in black and white along Woodward Avenue.
Flint On June 14, several community organizations painted "Black Lives Matter!" on Martin Luther King Jr. Avenue.
Jackson On June 14, "Black Lives Matter" was painted in Pan-African colors along High Street near Elnora Moorman Plaza and a house listed in The Negro Motorist Green Book. "Black Lives Matter" was also painted in yellow along West Washington Avenue.
Kalamazoo On June 19, "Black Lives Matter" was painted along the center turn lane of Rose Street.

Minnesota

Minneapolis On July 18, the Minnesota African American Heritage Museum and Gallery coordinated the painting of "Black Lives Matter" in -high letters on the street outside the museum, along Plymouth Avenue North between Newton and Penn avenues. 16 artists participated, each designing one letter.

Mississippi
Hattiesburg On June 12, residents painted "Black Lives Matter" along Mobile Street using temporary yellow paint.
Moss Point On June 20, officials painted "Black Lives Matter" and the movement's fist logo on the street in front of city hall.

Missouri
Florissant From June 19 to 21, activists attempted three times to paint "Black Lives Matter" in  white lettering along North Lindbergh Boulevard in front of the police department, but the city painted over the mural and arrested two activists for violating a local ordinance against street painting.
Kansas City On September 5, six massive "Black Lives Matter" murals were painted across the city. Each mural was designed by a Black artist as part of a project called KC Art on the Block, is highly detailed, and covers the street for the length of at least one block. Some were enhanced in response to vandalism.

New Jersey
Atlantic City In September it was agreed the paint a mural at the city's Civil Right Park and not the Boardwalk.
Elizabeth On August 2, a "Black Lives Matter" mural at MLK Plaza across from City Hall was dedicated, with George Floyd's brother, Terrence Floyd, and Eric Garner's mother, Gwendolyn Carr, in attendance.
Highland Park On June 18, volunteers painted "Black Lives Matter" on South 5th Avenue across from the police and fire departments and borough hall.
Newark On June 27, a stretch of Halsey Street was painted with "Black Lives Matter".
Orange Township Mayor Dwayne D. Warren, Esq., Councilwoman-at-Large Adrienne Wooten and South Ward Councilwoman Jamie Summers-Johnson participated with the community to unveil its Black Lives Matter mural to the public. Painted on Main Street on Aug. 8, the mural has been receiving rave reviews.

New York

Albany A community advocacy group painted "Black Lives Matter" in yellow along Lark Street, one of the city's busiest streets. Albany Common Council renamed Livingston Park to Black Lives Matter Park.
Buffalo A proposed resolution in Buffalo Common Council would rename Fillmore Avenue to "Black Lives Matter Way". D'Youville College commissioned mural named "Black Matter is Life" be painted by Maxx Moses on their campus off of Porter Avenue.
Cortland, NY - On June 29, 2020, a mural was painted downtown on Main Street. - https://cortlandvoice.com/2020/06/30/black-lives-matter-mural-painted-in-downtown-cortland-videos-photos-included/.
New York City multiple street murals were painted (see Black Lives Matter art in New York City)
Nyack On June 19, "Black Lives Matter" and the movement's fist logo were painted in the pan-African colors in tempera paint along Main Street.

Oswego On June 14, the State University of New York at Oswego painted "Black Lives Matter" in yellow in front of Sheldon Hall.
Rochester On June 11, volunteers painted "Black Lives Matter" along Court Street in blue,  lettering with the Black Lives Matter movement's fist logo on one end and Rochester's Flower City logo on the other end.
Schenectady On June 23, "Black Lives Matter" was painted in yellow along Jay Street in front of the city hall.
Syracuse A local attorney obtained a permit to paint "Black Lives Matter" on a street in front of the city hall.

North Carolina

Asheville On June 21, protesters painted "Defund the Police" in yellow along Spruce Street in front of the police department. On June 22, the city washed away the mural.
Charlotte On June 9, "Black Lives Matter" was painted on South Tryon Street. By June 12, it had been vandalized with skid marks. On November 10, the city council voted 10–1 to reopen the street even though more businesses were benefitting from the mural being there than losing money from the street being closed.
Elizabeth City There is a "Black Lives Matter" mural painted on East Colonial Avenue.  This mural was painted in honor of Andrew Brown Jr., who was shot and killed by a Pasquotank County Sheriff's deputy.
Fayetteville "Black Lives Do Matter" and "End Racism Now" will be painted on the street encircling the Market House.
Raleigh A dozen volunteers painted "End Racism Now" in yellow on a street near the Contemporary Art Museum of Raleigh.

Ohio
Akron On June 18, "Black Lives Matter" was painted with permanent paint along Howard Street, near the site of the fatal shooting of a recent high school graduate, Na'Kia Crawford, the previous Sunday.
Cincinnati Local artists painted "Black Lives Matter!" on Plum Street in front of Cincinnati City Hall. Seventeen local artists were each assigned a letter and up to seven assistants. Based on a Poem written by Alandes Powell the mural was designed and painted in less than five days.  
The Urban League of Greater Southwestern Ohio raised over $100,000 for the project, with proceeds going to a local art group. The mural is expected to last until 2025.
Cleveland On June 20, local artists painted "Black Lives Matter" temporarily along East 93rd Street as part of the Elevate the East art project.

Oklahoma
Oklahoma City "Black Voices" and "Black Lives Matter" were painted on streets in Downtown and Northeast Oklahoma City, respectively.
Tulsa Overnight on June 19, "Black Lives Matter" was painted in yellow along Greenwood Avenue in the Greenwood District, on the site of the Tusla Race Massacre. It was removed by the city on October 6th.

Oregon
Eugene On June 18, local artists with the Eugene BIPOC Art Collective painted "Black Lives Matter" in yellow lettering with black handprints along 8th Avenue downtown in front of the Wayne Lyman Morse United States Courthouse. That night, the mural was defaced with tire tracks. Over the following days a suspect was identified, and the artists and the community added to the mural, incorporating the tracks into the design by covering them with handprints of all colors of the rainbow.
 Portland  On June 18, "Black Lives Matter" was painted on North Edison Street by the neighborhood. Inside the letters detailed stories about minority history in the area were included, starting the first black visitor from the Lewis and Clark expedition in 1800, ending with stories from 2018. It was vandalized on July 21.

Pennsylvania
Philadelphia A pastor had "End Racism Now" painted in yellow on a street in the Fishtown neighborhood. City crews tried unsuccessfully to remove it.

South Carolina
Spartanburg On June 20, volunteers painted "Black Lives Matter" along West Broad Street.

Tennessee
Chattanooga On June 29, volunteers painted "Black Lives Matter" on Dr. Martin Luther King Blvd in front of the Bessie Smith Cultural Center.

Texas

Austin "Black Austin Matters" was painted in yellow along Congress Avenue. The Austin Justice Coalition painted "Black Artists Matter" in yellow along East 11th Street in the Central East Austin neighborhood.
Dallas "Black Lives Matter" was painted across the plaza in front of Dallas City Hall.
Houston On June 19, "Black Towns Matter" was painted in red and yellow lettering along Link Road in Independence Heights, the first city incorporated by African-Americans in Texas.
Prairie View On June 19, Prairie View A&M University students painted a permanent "Black Lives Matter" street mural along Sandra Bland Parkway.

Utah

 Salt Lake City

Vermont
Montpelier On June 13, hundreds of volunteers painted "Black Lives Matter" in yellow on the street in front of the Vermont State House. The mural was vandalized the following day.

Virginia
Harrisonburg On September 23, the Black Student Alliance of Eastern Mennonite University unveiled its 114-foot-long “Black Lives Matter” mural painted in yellow street paint at the entrance of the University Commons.

Washington
Seattle Local artists painted a colorful Black Lives Matter street mural in the Capitol Hill Autonomous Zone. In 2021, a second mural was painted outside Seattle City Hall.

Wisconsin
Madison On June 8, protesters painted "Defund Police" in yellow along Martin Luther King Junior Boulevard downtown.
Milwaukee On June 19, "Black Lives Matter" was painted in yellow along North Martin Luther King Junior Drive adjacent to a police station in the Harambee neighborhood. Much of the mural washed away in a thunderstorm the following day.

Other countries

Similar street murals have been painted outside the United States:
 In Brunswick, Victoria, residents painted "Black Lives Matter" in black against a green background on Florence Street.
 In Toronto, protesters painted "Defund the Police" in hot pink along College Street outside Toronto Police Service headquarters.
 In Greenwich, Greenwich London Borough Council painted "Black Lives Matter" across General Gordon Square.

See also
2020–2021 United States racial unrest
George Floyd and Anti-racist Street Art Database
 
 Black Lives Matter Memorial Fence

References

External links

Satellite photograph of the original mural by Maxar Technologies

Black Lives Matter art
Murals
Black Lives Matter street murals
African American-related lists